20th Battalion may refer to:

20th Battalion (Australia), a World War I ANZAC battalion
2/20th Battalion (Australia), a World War II Australian infantry battalion
20th (Central Ontario) Battalion, CEF, a World War I battalion for the Canadian Corps
20th Battalion, London Regiment (Blackheath and Woolwich)
 20th Battalion (New Zealand), a World War II infantry battalion

See also
 20th Brigade (disambiguation)
 20th Division (disambiguation)
 20th Regiment (disambiguation)
 20th Special Forces Group, a US Army National Guard group
 20 Squadron (disambiguation)
 XX Corps (disambiguation)